Panaeolus cyanescens is a mushroom in the Bolbitiaceae family.  Panaeolus cyanescens is a common psychoactive mushroom and is similar to Panaeolus tropicalis.

Description 
Cap: 1.5 – 4 cm across, dry, at first hemispheric, expanding to campanulate to convex, with an incurved margin when young.  Young caps start out light brown and fade to off-white or light gray at maturity, sometimes with yellowish or brownish tones.  Often developing cracks in dry weather, slightly hygrophanous, turning greenish or blue where damaged.
Gills: Broadly adnate to adnexed attachment, close, starting out gray and turning black as the spores mature.  Gill faces with a mottled appearance, edges white.
Spores: Jet Black, 12 - 15 x 7 - 11 µm, smooth, opaque, elliptical.  With a germ pore.
Stipe: 7 – 12 cm long by 2 to 3 mm thick, equal to slightly enlarged at the base, pruinose, colored like the cap, staining blue where bruised.
Taste: Farinaceous.
Odor: Farinaceous.
Microscopic features: Basidia 4 spored, pleurocystidia fusoid-ventricose, cheilocystidia 12 x 4 µm.

Distribution and habitat 
Panaeolus cyanescens is a coprophilous (dung-inhabiting) species which grows in tropical and neotropical areas in both hemispheres.  It has been found in Africa (including South Africa, Madagascar and Democratic Republic of the Congo), Australia, Bali, Belize, Brasil, Borneo, the Caribbean (Bermuda, Grenada, (Barbados, granyte) Jamaica, Trinidad), Puerto Rico, Costa Rica, India, Malaysia, Indonesia (including Sumatra), Sri Lanka, Cambodia, Thailand, Japan, Mexico, Oceania (including Fiji and Samoa), the Philippines, South America (including Bolivia, Brazil, Paraguay, Colombia, Venezuela), South Korea,  Tasmania, and the United States (California, Hawaii, Louisiana, Mississippi, Alabama, Florida, Tennessee, Texas, and North Carolina).

Alkaloid content 
Laussmann & Sigrid Meier-Giebing (2010) reported the presence of psilocybin at 2.5% and psilocin at 1.194% average from 25 samples seized by German customs that were shipments from commercial growers (making modern commercially cultivated strains of this species the most potent hallucinogenic mushrooms ever described in reputable published research).  Other researchers have documented a significant presence of serotonin and urea in this species as well as the presence of baeocystin which may also be psychoactive.

See also

List of Panaeolus species

References

Bibliography

External links
 Panaeolus cyanescens cultivation
 New simple method (TEK) for growing Panaeolus cyanescens (aka Copelandia cyanescens, Hawaiians, blue meanies, Pans and Pan cyans)

cyanescens
Psychoactive fungi
Psychedelic tryptamine carriers
Fungi of Oceania
Taxa named by Christopher Edmund Broome
Fungi without expected TNC conservation status